The University of Tokyo Atacama Observatory (TAO) is an astronomical observatory located on the summit of Cerro Chajnantor, at an altitude of  within a lava dome in the Atacama Desert of northern Chile. It is also  higher than the Fred Young Submillimeter Telescope proposed for the same peak.

The eventual goal of the project is to construct the TAO telescope (or TAO 6.5m telescope), a  optical-infrared telescope at the site. A first step towards that goal has been the construction and installation of a  pilot telescope, called miniTAO, completed in 2009.  With miniTAO's first light achieved in March 2009 in the visible region, and in June 2009 for the infrared region, the observatory has become the highest permanent astronomical observatory in the world. The high altitude of the observatory is essential for its mission, for it is an infrared light observatory, and infrared light is absorbed by the water vapor in the atmosphere making it imperative that an infrared observatory be located in high altitude where the atmosphere is sparse. In 2023, TAO was noted as one of only a few major telescopes in the world with light pollution below acceptable levels of interference.

Description 
The secondary mirror will be equipped with adaptive optics to compensate for atmospheric turbulence. A third mirror will allow switching between several instruments. There will be a Cassegrain focus for the mid-infrared range, a Nasmyth focus for the near-infrared range and another Nasmyth focus for far-infrared.

The project started with site studies in the late 1990s and early 2000s. Road construction to the summit of Cerro Chajnantor started in November 2005. Road was opened April 2006. The miniTAO pilot telescope was constructed in 2009. MiniTAO allowed the project to determine the viewing radius of the full-size telescope. The construction of the TAO telescope started in 2013.

The telescope will have two primary instruments, the MIMIZUKU mid-infrared imager and spectrograph, and SWIMS near-infrared spectrograph. Both instruments were tested at the Subaru telescope and achieved first light in the summer of 2018. After testing, the instruments are to be installed into the TAO telescope in 2023. MIMIZUKU has similar spatial resolution to the James Webb Space Telescope's Mid-Infrared Instrument (MIRI) and wider frequency range, although it is less sensitive.

Ground-breaking ceremonies at the site were held at late 2017. In January 2018, the TAO telescope mount construction was completed and the telescope mount assembled in Japan. This was done for testing purposes; the telescope was disassembled and shipped to Chile on multiple vessels in 2020. The observation and operations building was similarly assembled in Kazo, Saitama in May 2020 for testing purposes, and then disassembled and shipped on eight separate vessels over the course of 2021.

First observations are currently planned for the end of 2023.

See also
 List of astronomical observatories
 List of highest astronomical observatories
 Llano de Chajnantor Observatory

References

External links
 The University of Tokyo Atacama Observatory Project (English translation) includes numerous photos of observatory construction

Astronomical observatories in Chile
2009 establishments in Chile